Appan is a 2022 Malayalam-language comedy-drama film co-written and directed by Maju and jointly produced by Josekutty Madathil, and Ranjith Manambarakkat under the banners of Sunny Wayne Productions and Tiny Hands Productions.  The film stars Wayne as a rubber tapper, with Ananya, Alencier Ley Lopez, Grace Antony, and Pauly Valsan featuring in major supporting roles. The cinematography of Appan was done by Pappu and was edited by Kiran Das. The soundtrack was composed by Dawn Vincent.

Plot
Njoonju a rubber tapper lives with his father, mother, wife and his son in a small village. 

Ittychan, his father is a narcissistic, cruel womaniser who harasses, abuses, and tortures his wife, Kuttyamma and Njoonju despite being bedridden. All his family members await for his death. The villagers who had bitter experience of his behavior in the past makes plan to kill him. 

He even manipulates his family members to live with their next-door neighbour and prostitute, Sheela. Noonju makes plan to leave the village but can't force himself to leave from his duties as a son. 

Meanwhile, Ittychan friend dies committing suicide after listening to news that Kuriakose is released from Jail. 

On a Christmas evening Kuriakose, whose wife was raped by Ittychan comes to their house to kill him. Njoonju tries to protect his father. While Njoonju and Kuriakose was fighting Ittychan asks Kuriakose to kill Njoonju and to take the women and in return give back his life. Sheela, whose father was killed by Itty to own her gets furious by his words and stabs Ittychan to death. Kuriakose leaves the house. Njoonju and family informs the neighborhood that Ittychan died from a mild attack.

Cast 
Sunny Wayne as Njoonju
Alencier Ley Lopez as Ittychan, Njoonju's father
Pauly Valsan as Kuttyamma, Ittychan's wife
Ananya as Rosy, Njoonju's wife
Grace Antony as Molykutty, Njoonju's younger sister
Vijilesh Karayad as Boban, Molykutty's husband
Radhika Radhakrishnan as Sheela
Anil K. Sivaram as Varghese, Ittychan's friend
Drupad Krishna as Abel, Njoonju's son
Geethi Sangeetha as Latha ,a neighbour 
Unni Raja as Suku
Shamsudheen Makarathodi as Jhonson
Ashraf as Kuriako

Filming
The film began principal photography in September 2021 at Thodupuzha in Kerala, where the film was extensively shot. Filming was completed in 50 days.

Release 
Initially the film was planned to be released in theatres. Later the film was released through the SonyLIV platform on 27 October 2022.

References

2022 films
2022 drama films
Indian drama films
2020s Malayalam-language films
Indian direct-to-video films
2022 direct-to-video films
SonyLIV original films
Films about dysfunctional families
Films shot in Idukki